Askarabad may refer to:

 Əsgərabad, Azerbaijan
 Askarabad, Fars, Iran
 Askarabad, Gilan, Iran
 Askarabad, Rudsar, Gilan Province, Iran
 Askarabad, East Azerbaijan, Iran
 Askarabad-e Deli Bajak, Kohgiluyeh and Boyer-Ahmad Province, Iran
 Askarabad, Tehran, Iran
 Askarabad, West Azerbaijan, Iran
 Asgharabad, Zagheh, Iran

See also
 Asgarabad (disambiguation)
 Asgharabad (disambiguation)